Ludwig-Uhland-Preis is a literature prize awarded in Baden-Württemberg, Germany. The award ceremony of the biennial prize traditionally takes place on 26 April, Ludwig Uhland's birthday, in Ludwigsburg Palace. Winners range from literary scholars to political scientists. The award is endowed with 10,000 euros (promotional prize 5,000 euros).

Winners

Winners of the grand prize 
 1991: Wilhelm Koenig, vernacular writer
 1994: Hermann Bausinger, empirical cultural studies
 1997: Karl Moersch, writer and politician
 1999: Arno Ruoff dialects researcher
 2001: Bernhard Zeller, literary historian and archivist
 2003: Hans-Georg Wehling, a political scientist
 2005: Manfred Bosch, writer
 2007: Gottlob Haag, dialect poet
 2009: Hans-Ulrich Simon, literary scholar
 2011: Bernard Hurm and Uwe Zellmer, Theater Lindenhof in Melchingen
 2013: Hellmut G. Haasis, writer
 2015: Bernhard Fischer, literary scholar, director of the Goethe- and Schiller-Archive Weimar
 2017: Mathias Beer, historian, Universität Tübingen
 2019: Dieter Langewiesche, historian, Universität Tübingen

Winners of the promotional prize
 2001: Helmuth Mojem
 2003: Petra Zwerenz, dialect writer
 2005: Marek Hałub, Germanist
 2007: Kurt Oesterle, writer
 2009: Walle Sayer, vernacular writers
 2011: Hubert Kloepfer, publisher
 2013: Georg Günther, musicologist
 2015: Susanne Hinkelbein, composer an playwright
 2017: Stefan Knödler, Germanist, Universität Tübingen
 2019: Dominik Kuhn, language artist and Swabian voice actor, Reutlingen

References

Literary awards of Baden-Württemberg